Robert John Christo, was an Australian-Indian civil engineer and actor in Hindi films. Starting with Sanjay Khan's Abdullah (1980), he went on to act in over 200 Hindi films in the 1980s and 1990s, including Qurbani (1980), Kaalia (1981), Nastik (1983), Mard (1985), Mr India (1987), Roop Ki Rani Choron Ka Raja (1993) and Gumraah (1993), mostly playing roles as a non Indian henchman or Army General.

Career
Born in Sydney, Christo was a qualified Civil Engineer of Greek and German descent. He had two brothers, Helmut and Mike. Known for his brawny physique and bald-headed look, Bob arrived in Bombay, India whilst awaiting a work permit to Muscat, Oman. It was in Mumbai that he was introduced to Bollywood actress Parveen Babi, who helped him transition into Hindi films.

He received his first break when he constructed the jungle palace for Francis Ford Coppola in "Apocalypse Now". And later as a villain in the Hindi movie Abdullah in 1980. Christo decided to stay in India and appeared in over 200 movies in Hindi, Tamil, Telugu, Malayalam and Kannada, playing a recurring typecast villain.

Sanjay Khan discovered him and gave him his first break in his movie Abdullah as the villain, and also after many years, Sanjay Khan gave him a break in his first ever television serial, The Great Maratha, where he played the iconic character of Ahmed Shah Abdali.

During the later stages of his life, he relocated to Bangalore in early 2000, where he started working as a Yoga instructor and remained disconnected from the Hindi movie industry since 2003.

Death
The 72-year-old actor died of "rupture of left ventricle valve" in Bangalore on 20 March 2011. He is survived by his wife Nargis and two sons, Darius and Sunil. He has two daughters, Monique and Nicole from a previous marriage.

Filmography

Film

Television

Works
 Flashback: My Life and Times in Bollywood and Beyond, by Bob Christo. Penguin India, 2011. .

See also
List of Indian film actors

References

External links

1938 births
20th-century Indian male actors
21st-century Indian male actors
2011 deaths
Australian civil engineers
Australian emigrants to India
Australian expatriates in Germany
Australian expatriates in Austria
Australian male film actors
Indian autobiographers
Indian male film actors
Indian people of German descent
Indian people of Greek descent
Male actors from Bangalore
Male actors from Sydney
Male actors in Hindi cinema
Male actors in Hindi television
Male actors in Kannada cinema
Male actors in Malayalam cinema
Male actors in Tamil cinema
Male actors in Telugu cinema
People who lost Australian citizenship
People with acquired Indian citizenship
Set designers